R. K. Films was an Indian film production company based in R. K. Studio, a film studio, both established by and named after the Bollywood actor Raj Kapoor. It was headquartered at Chembur, Mumbai. Founded in 1948, one year after India gained independence. It had a rough start, as its first movie, Aag (1948) did not perform well at the box office. Most of the R. K. Films productions share a common theme of criticising society and depicting love across social divides.

History

R. K. Films was formed in 1948 by Raj Kapoor in Chembur.

After the commercial failure of the studio's first venture, Aag (1948), it found success with Barsaat (1949). After this success, the company's logo was designed to imitate the poster of Barsaat. RK Films produced many successful films such as Awaara (1951), Boot Polish, Jagte Raho and Shree 420. Awaara was particularly successful, not just in India, but all over the world. Many R. K. Films movies featured Kapoor opposite actress Nargis. Kapoor appeared in 15 R. K. films with Nargis and travelled around the world with her to promote the studio's films. The music team of Shankar Jaikishan also worked frequently on R. K. Films productions during this period. Starting with Awaara (1951), Radhu Karmakar shot all of Kapoor's subsequent films for four decades, till his last, Ram Teri Ganga Maili (1985).

R. K. Films produced many films in the next few decades, including Jis Desh Men Ganga Behti Hai (1960), Mera Naam Joker (1970), Bobby (1973), Satyam Shivam Sundaram (1978), Prem Rog (1982) and Ram Teri Ganga Maili (1985), Kapoor's last film. In the 1970s, Kapoor's eldest son Randhir Kapoor joined his father at the studio, and made his acting and directorial debut with Kal Aaj Aur Kal in 1971, which also starred his future wife Babita, father Raj and grandfather Prithviraj Kapoor. He went on to direct two more films with the company Dharam Karam (1975) and an incomplete film left by Raj, which he completed after his father's death in 1988 and Henna (1991). Raj's brother Shashi Kapoor also appeared in several R. K. films. When Raj died in 1988, Randhir took over the studio. His younger brother Rajiv Kapoor directed Prem Granth in 1996 and Rishi Kapoor directed Aa Ab Laut Chalen (1999).  Hereafter, the Kapoors have produced no more films under the R. K. Films banner. Unlike other Bollywood studios of the time period, R.K. Films was able to preserve all the costumes used in its films.

On 16 September 2017, R. K. Studio caught fire and collapsed. A massive fire broke out in the studio during the shoot of a television reality show and the studio was engulfed in fire. The Kapoor family has decided to sell the iconic R. K. Films and Studios, which was built by legendary actor Raj Kapoor nearly 70 years ago, due to growing losses. Located in Chembur, the studio was in the news September 2017, after a major fire broke out, leaving the place gutted. Speaking to Mumbai Mirror, Rishi Kapoor said on behalf of the family: "The investment in rebuilding the studio would just not have yielded sufficient revenue to keep it going. Even before the fire, for years R. K. Studio had become a huge white elephant, toting up losses."

He mentioned that the number of bookings had decreased substantially over the years with producers preferring studios near Goregaon and Andheri. Being part of the Eastern suburbs, Chembur was no longer seen as a lucrative shooting space, like it was back in the 40s and 50s. The Kapoors even considered renovating the whole space with cutting-edge technology; however, the fire last year made their plans to revive the studios even more unrealistic.

The handful of clients using the studios had started demanding free parking space, air-conditioning, and discounts, claims Rishi, which had further added to the losses. A team employed by the family has initiated the negotiations for the sale of the premises.

Logo 

The logo of R. K. Films is based on a scene from the film Barsaat, as can be seen in the poster for the movie. The logo was later simplified. Bollywood actor Manoj Kumar has claimed that the logo was designed by Balasaheb Thackeray. It may possibly have been inspired by The Kreutzer Sonata.

R. K. Studio 

The studio occupied nearly two acres of land in the Mumbai-suburb of Chembur. The studio's main building was constructed in the early 1950s. Raj Kapoor's cottage was behind this building where he often organized small intimate meetings and functions. The 25th anniversary of R. K. Films was celebrated here.

There was a makeshift museum (once Nargis's dressing & make-up room) was a treasure trove which was lost in the fire. It included posters from Barsaat (1949), Awaara (1951), Aag (1948), Mera Naam Joker (1970) and Bobby (1973). It also had a large black umbrella that protected the couple from the studio rain in the song "Pyar Hua, Ikrar Hua" in Shree 420 (1955), Nargis's long black dress from Awaara, Vyjanthimala's sari(s) from Sangam, Dimple Kapadia's funky frocks from Bobby, Padmini's sari(s) from Jis Desh Mein Ganga Behti Hai, the dafali used in Mera Naam Raju (Jis Desh Mein Ganga Behti Hai) and even some of the hats Raj Kapoor wore in his films. These were lost in the fire. Rishi Kapoor regarded that as the greatest loss due to the fire.

The sets constructed at the studio included:
 Set for "Ghar Aaya Mera Pardesi" dream sequence in Kapoor's Awaara with the Elephant-inspired image
 Set for "Pyar Hua Ikrar Hua"
 Haveli Set for song "Yeh Galiyan Yeh Chaubara Yahan Aana Na Dobara", Prem Rog, 1982
 Banares set for Ram Teri Ganga Maili, 1985

Festivals at R. K. Studio 
Festivals like Ganesh Chaturthi (Ganapati)  and Holi  were regularly celebrated by the Kapoor family together with their distinguished guests.

Filmography

Awards

|-
| 1955
| Shree 420
| National Film Award for Best Feature Film in Hindi
| 
|-
| 1956
| Ek Din Ratre
| National Film Award for Best Feature Film in Bengali
| 
|-
| 1955
| Boot Polish
| rowspan="4"|Filmfare Award for Best Film
| 
|-
| 1962
| Jis Desh Mein Ganga Behti Hai
| 
|-
| 1986
| Ram Teri Ganga Maili
| 
|-
| 1983
| Prem Rog
| 
|}

Acquisition 
Godrej Properties, part of Godrej group, acquired R.K.Studios Land in 2018. The confirmation was publicly made on 3 May 2019. The company did not disclose the deal value. RK Studios sold to Godrej Properties will be made into a residential complex.

See also
  Raj Kapoor's memorial at family farm in Pune
  Kapoor family

Bibliography

References

External links
 R. K. Films at Bollywood Hungama

 
Film studios in Mumbai
Film production companies of India
Entertainment companies established in 1948
Raj Kapoor
Filmfare Awards winners
Indian companies established in 1948